In enzymology, a thiamine-diphosphate kinase is an enzyme involved in thiamine metabolism. It catalyzes the chemical reaction

thiamine diphosphate + ATP  thiamine triphosphate + ADP

Thus, the two substrates of this enzyme are ATP and thiamine diphosphate, whereas its two products are ADP and thiamine triphosphate.

This enzyme belongs to the family of transferases, specifically those transferring phosphorus-containing groups (phosphotransferases) with a phosphate group as acceptor. The systematic name of this enzyme class is ATP:thiamine-diphosphate phosphotransferase. Other names in common use include ATP:thiamin-diphosphate phosphotransferase, TDP kinase, thiamin diphosphate kinase, thiamin diphosphate phosphotransferase, thiamin pyrophosphate kinase, thiamine diphosphate kinase, and protein bound thiamin diphosphate:ATP phosphoryltransferase.

See also
 Thiamine-triphosphatase

References

 
 

EC 2.7.4
Enzymes of unknown structure